Snehathinte Mukhangal is a 1978 Indian Malayalam film,  directed by Hariharan and produced by K. C. Joy. The film stars Prem Nazir, Madhu, Jayabharathi and Janardanan in the lead roles. The film has a music score by M. S. Viswanathan.

Cast
Prem Nazir as Sreedharan
Madhu as Devadas
Jayabharathi as Lakshmi
Paravoor Bharathan as Jyotsyar
Kanakadurga as Savithri
Seema as Radhika
Vincent as Mohan
Sankaradi as Ammavan
Kottayam Shantha as Lakshmi's mother
Adoor Bhasi as Sarasappan
Sukumari as Sarasa
Vanchiyoor Radha as  Naaniyamma
T. R. Omana as Doctor
Mancheri Chandran
Thodupuzha Radhakrishnan

Soundtrack
The music was composed by M. S. Viswanathan and the lyrics were written by Mankombu Gopalakrishnan.

References

External links
 

1978 films
1970s Malayalam-language films
Films scored by M. S. Viswanathan
Films directed by Hariharan